KABB (channel 29) is a television station in San Antonio, Texas, United States, affiliated with the Fox network. It is owned by Sinclair Broadcast Group alongside dual NBC/CW affiliate WOAI-TV (channel 4); Sinclair also provides certain services to Kerrville-licensed Dabl affiliate KMYS (channel 35) under joint sales and shared services agreements (JSA/SSA) with Deerfield Media. The three stations share studios between Babcock Road and Sovereign Drive (off Loop 410) in northwest San Antonio, while KABB's transmitter is located in northwest Wilson County (near Elmendorf). The station brands itself as Fox San Antonio, even though it is stylized as Fox 29 through its logo.

History
KABB first signed on the air on December 16, 1987, as the first independent station in the San Antonio market since KRRT (channel 35, now Dabl affiliate KMYS)—which by that point, was the market's original Fox affiliate—debuted in November 1985. Channel 29 was originally owned by the Alamo Broadcasting Corporation, from which its call letters were taken.

Alamo Broadcasting sold the station to River City Broadcasting in 1989. In 1994, Paramount Pictures, then-owners of KRRT through its Paramount Stations Group subsidiary, entered into a partnership with Chris-Craft Industries—which owned NBC affiliate KMOL-TV (channel 4, now WOAI-TV) at the time—to create the United Paramount Network (UPN), with KRRT serving as the network's San Antonio affiliate. River City subsequently signed an affiliation agreement with Fox for KABB to become the network's new area affiliate; on January 16, 1995, KRRT dropped Fox programming to become the market's original affiliate of UPN, with KABB assuming the Fox affiliation, thus ending the latter's status as the longest serving independent television outlet in San Antonio after over seven years. 
Shortly afterward, KRRT entered into a local marketing agreement (LMA) with KABB after Paramount sold channel 35 to Jet Broadcasting. In 1996, the Sinclair Broadcast Group acquired River City Broadcasting's television stations.

The following year, Glencairn, Ltd. (which evolved into Cunningham Broadcasting) bought KRRT; the family of Sinclair Broadcast Group founder Julian Sinclair Smith owned 97% of Glencairn's stock (Glencairn was, in turn, to be paid with Sinclair stock for the purchases), effectively making KABB and KRRT a duopoly in violation of Federal Communications Commission (FCC) rules of the period. Glencairn had owned eleven television stations nationwide that Sinclair operated under LMAs; a later plan to sell five of its stations to Sinclair outright prompted the Rainbow/PUSH coalition (headed by Jesse Jackson) to file challenges, citing concerns over a single company holding two broadcast licenses in one market and arguing that Glencairn passed itself off as a minority-owned company (its president, former Sinclair executive Edwin Edwards, is African American) when it was really an arm of Sinclair, and used the LMA to gain control of the station. The FCC levied a $40,000 fine against Sinclair in 2001 for illegally controlling Glencairn. Sinclair purchased KRRT outright in 2001, creating the market's first television duopoly with KABB.

The station originally carried Fox's children's program block Fox Kids when it switched to the network in January 1995 and also carried its successors FoxBox and 4Kids TV; the network later discontinued the Fox Kids weekday blocks in 2002, with the Saturday morning lineup remaining until September 2006, when KABB became the eighth Fox station that was not involved in the switches resulting from the network's 1994 affiliation agreement with New World Communications (after WSVN in Miami, KMSP-TV in Minneapolis, KPTV in Portland, Oregon, WFLD in Chicago, KMSB-TV in Tucson, KMPH-TV in Fresno and KPTM in Omaha) to stop carrying the network's children's program block; Fox Kids successor 4Kids TV block was moved to sister station KMYS to accommodate a short-lived weekend expansion of its morning newscast Fox News First. The lineup remained on KMYS until 4Kids TV was discontinued by Fox (due to a dispute between the network and the block's lessee 4Kids Entertainment) in December 2008, after which Fox permanently discontinued providing network-supplied children's programming.

On May 15, 2012, the Sinclair Broadcast Group and Fox agreed to a five-year extension to the network's affiliation agreement with Sinclair's 19 Fox stations, including KABB, allowing them to continue to carry the network's programming through 2017.

On July 19, 2012, Sinclair announced that it would acquire NBC affiliate WOAI-TV (channel 4) from High Plains Broadcasting as part of its purchase of six television stations, along with the assumption of the operations of two others, from Newport Television. Since FCC duopoly regulations forbid common ownership of more than two full-power stations in a single market from being under the same ownership, Sinclair spun off KMYS to Deerfield Media; however, Sinclair retained control of KMYS through a shared services agreement (SSA). In addition, while FCC rules disallow ownership of two of the four highest-rated stations in the same market, which normally precludes duopolies involving two "Big Four" network affiliates, Sinclair cited in its FCC purchase application that WOAI ranked as the fourth highest-rated station (behind Univision owned-and-operated station KWEX-DT (channel 41)) and KABB the fifth-rated station in the San Antonio market in total day viewership. The Sinclair and Deerfield Media deals were consummated on December 3, 2012.

The operations of KABB and KMYS initially remained separate from WOAI-TV, with the two stations retaining competing news operations. However, in October 2013, the San Antonio Express-News reported that Sinclair planned to move WOAI's sales, promotions and executive offices from its downtown San Antonio studios on Navarro Street to a new building adjacent to KABB and KMYS' shared Babcock Road facility; the transition of WOAI employees to the KABB/KMYS complex was finalized in the summer of 2014, with the completion of a shared newsroom on the second floor of the building that accommodates both WOAI and KABB's respective news staffs. The combined Sinclair news operation is the largest in the city.

News operation

KABB presently broadcasts 27⅓ hours of locally produced newscasts each week (with 5⅓ hours each weekday and 30 minutes each on Saturdays and Sundays); in addition, the station produces the sports highlight program Maximum Sports, which airs on weeknights during the final ten minutes of the 9:00 p.m. newscast and as a standalone half-hour program on Saturdays and Sundays at 9:30 p.m. as well as the lifestyle program Daytime at Nine, which airs weekday mornings at 9:00 a.m.

River City Broadcasting started a news department for KABB shortly before the company's merger with the Sinclair Broadcast Group. On March 20, 1995, the station began producing a half-hour prime time newscast at 9:00 p.m. each weeknight, originally titled The Nine O'Clock News. The station expanded the weeknight broadcast of The Nine O'Clock News to one hour in 1998; this was followed by the addition of hour-long weekend editions of the 9:00 p.m. broadcast by 1999. In 1999, the station began to produce a half-hour late afternoon newscast at 5:30 p.m. for sister station KRRT, which utilized the same anchors, meteorologist and sports staff as that seen on KABB's 9:00 p.m. newscast. The program was canceled in 2001 due to low ratings.

KABB programmed news outside its established 9:00 p.m. timeslot for the first time on channel 29 on January 2, 2006, when it premiered Fox News First, a three-hour morning newscast that aired weekdays from 6:00 to 9:00 a.m., replacing infomercials and children's programs that had previously aired that time period. On September 8, 2008, the program was expanded to four hours, with the addition of an hour-long block from 5:00 to 6:00 a.m.

KABB is one of the few local television newscasts in the United States to have syndicated its newscasts to other stations in nearby markets. Its morning and prime time newscasts also aired on Fox affiliates KIDY in San Angelo and KXVA in Abilene from September 2009 to September 2013 (simulcasts of Fox News First were added by both in October 2010) when the owner of those stations, London Broadcasting Company, launched half-hour prime time newscasts during the 9:00 p.m. hour; KXVA's MyNetworkTV-affiliated sister station KIDZ-LD rebroadcast KABB's 9:00 p.m. newscast nightly on a one-hour delay at 10:00 p.m. during the same timeframe.

On August 3, 2011, KABB became the fourth English-language television station in the San Antonio market to begin broadcasting its local newscasts in high definition. One month later on September 6, KABB launched an hour-long lifestyle program Daytime @ Nine, as a lead-out of its weekday morning newscast.

Upon Sinclair's purchase of fellow Fox affiliate KSCC in Corpus Christi, KABB's morning block of news from 7 to 10 a.m. began to be simulcast on that station.

Technical information

Subchannels
The station's signal is multiplexed:

On August 24, 2010, Sinclair signed a groupwide affiliation deal with The Country Network (which rebranded as ZUUS Country in July 2013), a digital subchannel network featuring country music videos, to the 28 of the company's stations. On October 31, 2015, the station switched its subchannel to the Sinclair-owned Comet network. On February 13, 2017, the station added a third subchannel with the soft launch of TBD.

On September 1, 2021, after the Launch of Antenna TV (which is carried on WOAI 4.2)'s spinoff Rewind TV, Comet was replaced by that network. 19 days later, Comet returned to 29.2 after TBD was moved to KMYS-DT2 29.2, causing Rewind TV to move to KABB-DT3.

Analog-to-digital conversion
On February 2, 2009, Sinclair told cable and satellite television providers via email that regardless of the exact mandatory switchover date to digital-only broadcasting for full-power stations (which Congress rescheduled for June 12 days later), the station would shut down its analog signal on the original transition date of February 17, making KABB and KMYS the first stations in the market to convert to digital-only broadcast transmissions.

KABB discontinued regular programming on its analog signal, over UHF channel 29, on February 17, 2009. The station's digital signal remained on its pre-transition UHF channel 30, using PSIP to display the station's virtual channel as its former UHF analog channel 29.

References

External links

Fox network affiliates
Comet (TV network) affiliates
Rewind TV affiliates
Television channels and stations established in 1987
Television stations in San Antonio
Sinclair Broadcast Group
1987 establishments in Texas